José is a Guatemalan feature-film social-drama by Li Cheng. It was first shown at the 75th Venice Film Festival in the Giornate degli Autori section on 6 September 2018. It is the first Guatemala and Central America film ever presented in Venice Film Festival.

The film centers the experiences a young gay Guatemalan man who lives with his mother. The coming-of-age film grapples with the realities of being an LGBTQ+ person searching for love in a highly Catholic and homophobic country.

Cast
 Enrique Salanic as José
 Manolo Herrera as Luis
 Ana Cecelia Mota as Mom
 Jhakelyn Waleska Gonzalez Gonzalez as Monica
 Esteban Lopez Ramirez as Carlos
 Juan Andres Molina Cardona as Juan

Reception

The Hollywood Reporter reviewer wrote of "a tender observational quality backed by confident visual sense" and the "unabashed treatment of gay sex and nudity", while Rich Cline called it "earthy and honest".

The film had its U.S. premiere at the Santa Barbara International Film Festival in 2019.

Awards 
José was awarded the Queer Lion on 7 September 2018. The film won Best Spanish Language Film at the Santa Barbara International Film Festival in 2019.

References 

Guatemalan drama films
American drama films
American LGBT-related films
2018 LGBT-related films
LGBT-related drama films
2010s American films